The Estadio Roque Battilana is a multi-purpose stadium, that is located in Asunción, Paraguay. In this scenario, with a capacity for 6,000 people, it serves as host of the football team Deportivo Recoleta.

Multi-purpose stadiums in Paraguay
Football venues in Asunción
Sports venues in Asunción
Sports venues completed in 2002
2002 establishments in Paraguay